Gieysztor, Geysztor is a Polish noble family name. The surname may be Russified to Geishtor or Geyshtor. It may refer to:

Aleksander Gieysztor (1916-1999), Polish medievalist historian
Jakób Gieysztor (:pl:Jakub Gieysztor)

See also
Giejsz

Polish-language surnames